Titles of the Welsh Court are the titles of the various Offices of State used in Wales during the Middle Ages. Below is a selection of the most important offices and titles:

The Royal Family
 , meaning "King"
 , meaning "Chief" or "Prince". A king was by default also a chief but a chief was not necessarily also a king. The title  is thought to share a common root with the Irish term .
 , was a title designating the heir to the throne. This title was borrowed from the Old English title  meaning "royal son".

Twelve Principal Officers of the Court
 , literally meaning "household head" was the title given to the captain of the household troops or bodyguards. It was a position usually filled by a member of the royal family and one which conferred a responsibility on the bearer to defend the ruler; a feudal Minister of Defence.
 , literally "household priest", a senior religious advisor.
 , meaning "steward" from the Old English term for "dish thane". Later this office name was replaced with the term Seneschal and came to be the principal diplomat and executive of the court: a feudal prime minister and foreign minister.
 , meaning "court judge" — a senior legal officer who arbitrated on affairs of the realm; a feudal Minister of Justice.
 , the chief falconer.
 , the chief huntsman (more literally "master of the hounds").
 , the chamberlain.
 , the household bard.
 , the doorkeeper of the royal hall, an honorific military rank.
 , the doorkeeper of the royal chamber, another honorific military rank.
 , the groom of the rein.
 , the court physician.

Footnotes

References
 The Welsh King and his Court, University of Wales Press (2000), edited by Thomas Charles-Edwards,  and Paul Russell, p. 19 & 27 (Prolegomena to the Laws of Court, by  Jenkins).

 Titles
 Titles
Medieval Wales
Legal history of Wales